The Oregon Film Museum is a museum highlighting and celebrating movies that were made in the U.S. state of Oregon. The museum is housed in the old Clatsop County Jail in Astoria, Oregon, which is on the National Register of Historic Places. The building was used in the opening chase sequence of the 1985 film The Goonies. The museum opened in 2010, coinciding with the 25th anniversary of the film.

The museum features hands-on exhibits related to films that were made in Oregon, which include, in addition to The Goonies, Kindergarten Cop, Free Willy, Twilight, The Shining, Sometimes a Great Notion and National Lampoon's Animal House. It contains several props from The Goonies, in addition to memorabilia, costumes and various collectibles that are on display within the former jail cells. Visitors can also create their own short films in an exhibit that features small sets and green screens. As of 2015, an "ORV" similar to the one used by the Fratelli gang in The Goonies can be found in the parking lot complete with imitation bullet holes near the rear license plate.

See also
List of films shot in Oregon

External links
Oregon Film Museum Website

References

Museums established in 2010
Museums in Astoria, Oregon
National Register of Historic Places in Astoria, Oregon
History museums in Oregon
Cinema museums in the United States
2010 establishments in Oregon
Historic district contributing properties in Oregon
Government buildings on the National Register of Historic Places in Oregon